Black to the Future is the fourth and final studio album by British jazz group Sons of Kemet. It was released via Impulse! Records on 14 May 2021 to widespread critical acclaim from music critics.

Critical reception 

The album received widespread acclaim from critics. At Metacritic, which assigns a normalized rating out of 100 to reviews from professional publications, the album received an average score of 84, based on 16 reviews, indicating "universal acclaim". Aggregator AnyDecentMusic? gave the album a 8.6 out of 10, based on their assessment of the critical consensus.

Accolades

Track listing

Personnel
Credits adapted from Mojo review.
Shabaka Hutchingstenor saxophone, woodwinds
Theon Crosstuba
Edward Wakili-Hickpercussion
Tom Skinnerpercussion
Steve Williamsontenor saxophone
Joshua Idehenvocals
Angel Bat Dawidvocals
Moor Mothervocals
D Double Evocals
Kojey Radicalvocals
Lianne La Havasvocals

Charts

References

2021 albums
Impulse! Records albums
Sons of Kemet albums